Nandita Behera (née Pattnaik) is an Odissi dance instructor and founder of Odissi Dance Circle in Cerritos, California.  A student of Guru Kelucharan Mohapatra and Guru Gangadhar Pradhan, Nandita Behera has been teaching Odissi in California for the past twenty years.  She was awarded Sringaramanai by Sur Singar Samsad Bombay and is also a recipient of the National Scholarship for Dance in India.

See also 
 Dance in India
 Indian classical dance

References

External links
Website for Odissi Dance Circle

1957 births
Living people
Artists from Bhubaneswar
Odissi exponents
Indian female classical dancers
Performers of Indian classical dance
Indian emigrants to the United States
Dancers from Odisha